Richard Turner may refer to:

Politicians
 Richard C. Turner (1927–1986), American politician, who served Senator and Attorney General of Iowa
 Richard Turner (New Jersey politician), American politician, and Mayor of Weehawken, New Jersey
 Richard Turner (Kentucky politician) (born 1935), member of the Kentucky House of Representatives
 Richard Turner (MP for Reigate) for Reigate
 Richard Turner (Canadian politician) (1843–1917), Canadian merchant and politician
 Richard Turner (MP for Bletchingley), in 1393, MP for Bletchingley

Sports
 Dick Turner (1932–2008), Australian rugby league footballer, coach and administrator
Dick Turner (footballer) (1866–after 1891), Wrexham A.F.C. and Wales international footballer
 Richard Turner (footballer) (1882–1960), British footballer
 Richard Turner (Worcestershire cricketer) (1886–1967), English cricketer
 Richard Turner (Cambridge University cricketer) (born 1932), English cricketer
 Richard Turner (American football) (born 1959), American football player
 Richard Turner (rugby union) (born 1968), New Zealand rugby union player

Others
 Richard Turner (musician) (1984-2011)
 Richard Turner (reformer) (before 1554–1565?), English Protestant reformer and Marian exile
 Richard Turner (rector) (1724–1791), English divine and author
 Richard Turner (writer) (1753–1788), English author
 Richard Turner (iron-founder) (1798–1881), Irishman
 Richard Turner (artist) (1940–2013), British poet and artist, also known as Turneramon
 Richard Turner (Australian artist), Australian artist in the Progressive Art Movement in Adelaide in the 1970s
 Richard Turner (magician) (born 1954), American card technician and poker player
 Richard Turner (computer scientist) (born 1954), American university professor
 Richard Turner (producer) (active from 2008), British radio producer
 Richard Turner (geologist) (1856–1940), Scottish physician, archaeologist and geologist
 Richard E. Turner (1920–1986), fighter pilot
 Richard Ernest William Turner (1871–1961), Canadian soldier
 Rick Turner (philosopher) (1942–1978), South African academic and anti-apartheid activist
 Rick Turner (luthier) (born 1943), American builder of guitars and basses